The Monarch advertising sign (letrero publicitario de Monarch in Spanish) is a neon billboard located on the roof of a building at 51 Rancagua Street, in the Santiago Metropolitan Region of Santiago, Chile. 

The sign was initially installed in 1954, and in 2010 was declared a National Monument of Chile. It is also classified as a Historical Monument.

History 

The Luminosos Parragué company built and installed the Monarch advertising sign in 1955.

According to the general manager of the company, Claudio Parragué says:

Translation to English:

The Monarch advertising sign is made of neon lighting. It turns on every night; at 9:00 PM in the summer and at 6:00 PM in the winter.

See also 
Valdivieso advertising sign
National Monuments of Chile

References

External links 
ID:2169 Consejo de Monumentos Nacionales (Chile)
 Sitio web oficial del fabricante (Parragué)

Individual signs
Buildings and structures completed in 1955
Buildings and structures in Santiago
1955 establishments in Chile